Docendo discimus is a Latin proverb meaning "by teaching, we learn."

It is perhaps derived from Seneca the Younger (c. 4 BC – 65 AD), who says in his Letters to Lucilius (Book I, letter 7, section 8): Homines dum docent discunt., meaning "Men learn while they teach."

Motto
Docendo discimus is the motto of the following institutions:
 911 Tactical Academy, Hollywood, Florida
 Smolensk State Medical University, Smolensk, Russian federation (СГМУ)
Pacific National University, Khabarovsk, Russian Federation
 University of Defense in Czech Republic
 Medisch- Natuurphilosophisch en Veterinair- Tandheelkundig Gezelschap “Christiaan Huygens”, Utrechtsch Studenten Corps, The Netherlands
 Cherepovets State University in Cherepovets, Russia
Azerbaijan University of Languages in Baku, Azerbaijan
Stranmillis University College in Belfast, Northern Ireland
 the University of Chichester in West Sussex, England
Central Washington University in Ellensburg, Washington
 Johnson State College in Johnson, Vermont
 Gillingham School in Dorset, England
 Novosibirsk State Technical University in Novosibirsk, Russia
 Oles Honchar Dnipro National University in Ukraine
 Federal College of Education Yola, Adamawa State, Nigeria.
 The Alexandru Ioan Cuza National College, Ploieşti, Romania
 Bulgarian Diplomatic Institute in Sofia, Bulgaria
 Saure AS in Norway
 New York International School
 Regional Cadet Instructor School (Central) - Canadian Forces
 Swedish Air Force Flying School
Hilford Grammar High School, Sydney
USAF, Maintenance Management Analysis, 2R0X1
 Newton Bright Educational Consultants, United Kingdom
 University of Chichester, UK

References

Heimbach, Elizabeth. Latin Everywhere, Everyday: A Latin Phrase Workbook. Bolchazy-Carducci: 2004. .
Stone. Jon, R. The Routledge Dictionary of Latin Quotations: The Illiterati's Guide to Latin Maxims, Mottoes, Proverbs, and Sayings. Routledge: 2004. .

Latin mottos
Latin philosophical phrases